The Independent Game Developers' Association (TIGA) is a trade association representing the business and commercial interests of some video and computer game developers in the UK and Europe.

History

TIGA was launched in 2001 by Patricia Hewitt. TIGA was a founding member of the European Game Developers Federation (EGDF).

Richard Wilson is the current CEO, succeeding Fred Hasson who held the post since TIGA was founded until the end of 2007.

Board members
The TIGA Board is elected by TIGA members at the TIGA AGM each December. One half of the directors of TIGA must resign before each AGM, although they are free to seek re-election. 12 directors represent independent developers (of which 10 represent full members and 2 represent associate members). A further 4 directors represent publisher developer members.

References

External links 
 

Information technology organizations based in Europe
Organisations based in London
Pan-European trade and professional organizations
Video game development
Video game organizations
Video game trade associations